Alkalawa (Hausa: Alƙalawa) was the capital of the Hausa city-state of Gobir, in what is now northern Nigeria.

History 
In the early 19th-century, Fulani jihadist Usman dan Fodio invaded Yunfa (ruler of the minor kingdom of Gobir) at Alkalawa. The city fell in October 1808, marking the end of resistance to Fulani rule in the region.

Bibliography 

 Research and Documentation Directors Government House, Kano.Kano Millennium:100 years in History.

Reference 

History of Nigeria